The 1973 Individual Speedway World Championship was the 28th edition of the official World Championship to determine the world champion rider.

The 1973 World Final was won by Polish rider Jerzy Szczakiel following a run-off in with defending champion Ivan Mauger after both riders had finished on 13 points. On the second lap of the run-off, Mauger fell in turn 3 after trying a risky passing move leaving Szczakiel to win easily. Another Polish rider, Zenon Plech finished third. Rank outsider Szczakiel, who had finished last with no points scored in his only other World Final appearance in Sweden in 1971, rode the meeting of his life and was only beaten in his final two rides before defeating Mauger in the run-off.

The final, held at the Silesian Stadium in Chorzów, Poland, is believed to have been held in front of the largest crowd in world speedway history, estimated to be around 130,000, though some reports put the size of the crowd as anywhere from 90,000 to 120,000. The previous record for a final was 95,000 during the 1938 Individual Speedway World Championship at Wembley.

Format changes
The format of the Championship changed for the 1973 event. This time the Polish riders were allowed five places in the World Final to be held in Poland. All other nations had to go through the European Final route to provide the remaining 11 riders for the World Final.

First round
British/Commonwealth Qualifying - 16 to British/Commonwealth Final
Scandinavian Qualifying - 16 to Nordic Final
Continental Qualifying - 16 to Continental Final

British/Commonwealth Qualifying

Scandinavian Qualifying

Continental Qualifying

Second round
British/Commonwealth Final - 8 to British/Commonwealth/Nordic final
Nordic Final -  8 to British/Commonwealth/Nordic final

British/Commonwealth Final
June 21, 1973
 Sheffield
 First 8 to British-Nordic Final

Nordic Final
June 6, 1973
 Norrköping
 First 8 to British-Nordic Final

Third round
British/Commonwealth/Nordic Final - 8 to European Final
Continental Final - 8 to European Final

British/Commonwealth/Nordic Final
August 1, 1973
 Coventry
 First 8 to European Final

Continental Final
 June 23, 1973
  Leningrad
 First 8 to European Final plus 1 reserve

Fourth round
European Final - 11 to World Final
Polish Qualifications - 5 to World Final

European Final
 August 19, 1973
  Abensberg
 First 11 to World Final plus 1 reserve

World Final

Final Controversy
The Final was surrounded by controversy, with decisions made by Georg Traunspurger, the referee assigned to the meeting by the FIM, seeming to favour the Polish riders. One of his decisions was to have 2nd reserve Andrzej Wyglenda of Poland race in Heat 16 in front of 1st reserve Tommy Jansson of Sweden (after Bernt Persson of Sweden was unable to ride), making it four Polish riders in the race. In the race, second placed Edward Jancarz, who led for the first three laps, seemed to let Zenon Plech take the lead in the final turn, allowing Plech, who had more points at that stage of the meeting, to collect another three points for the win.

His most controversial decision was to exclude Soviet rider Grigory Khlinovsky from heat 19. Khlinovsky had attempted to pass on the inside of Zenon Plech for the lead going into the back straight of the last lap. As he was passed by the Russian, Plech lost control of his bike and fell. Despite protests from riders and the Soviet officials Khlinovskywas excluded and England's Peter Collins, who was in 3rd place at the time of the crash, was awarded the heat win, Plech, who didn't actually finish the race, was awarded 2nd. The result of the two points he gained for second place allowed Plech to finish a clear third in the championship. Had Khlinovsky been the winner of the heat, he would have ended on 13 points, which would have put him in the run-off for the title with Szczakiel and Mauger.

British television commentator Dave Lanning called the ruling "The craziest piece of speedway regulations in the history of World Championship racing", before adding that "It seems to me that the authorities here in Katowice are making up the rules to suit themselves to get their boys a world title."

Final result
September 2, 1973
 Chorzów, Silesian Stadium
Referee:  Georg Traunspurger

References

1973
World Individual
World
Speedway competitions in Poland